The Senior women's race at the 1995 IAAF World Cross Country Championships was held in Durham, United Kingdom, at the University of Durham on March 25, 1995.   A report on the event was given in The New York Times and in the Herald.

Complete results, medallists, 
 and the results of British athletes were published.

Race results

Senior women's race (6.47 km)

Individual

Teams

Note: Athletes in parentheses did not score for the team result

Participation
An unofficial count yields the participation of 135 athletes from 39 countries in the Senior women's race.  This is in agreement with the official numbers as published.

 (5)
 (1)
 (4)
 (5)
 (5)
 (3)
 (1)
 (4)
 (1)
 (1)
 (1)
 (6)
 (6)
 (1)
 (6)
 (6)
 (4)
 (6)
 (4)
 (6)
 (2)
 (1)
 (1)
 (1)
 (1)
 (2)
 (1)
 (1)
 (6)
 (6)
 (6)
 (1)
 (6)
 (6)
 (1)
 (4)
 (6)
 (6)
 (1)

See also
 1995 IAAF World Cross Country Championships – Senior men's race
 1995 IAAF World Cross Country Championships – Junior men's race
 1995 IAAF World Cross Country Championships – Junior women's race

References

Senior women's race at the World Athletics Cross Country Championships
IAAF World Cross Country Championships
1995 in women's athletics